Phragmipedium caudatum, commonly called the Mandarin orchid, is a species of orchid occurring from Peru to Bolivia. It is the type species of the genus Phragmipedium.

References 

  

caudatum
Orchids of Bolivia
Orchids of Peru
Terrestrial orchids